Christian Neunhauserer (born 21 June 1978) is a retired Italian middle-distance runner. He represented his country at two consecutive World Indoor Championships.

International competitions

Personal bests
Outdoor
400 metres – 49.00 (Milan 2003)
800 metres – 1:46.07 (Rome 2002)
1000 metres – 2:21.54 (Rupertwinkel 2001)
1500 metres – 3:40.37 (Villafranca 2007)

Indoor
800 metres – 1:47.72 (Stuttgart 2003)
1000 metres – 2:19.45 ( 2002)
1500 metres – 3:42.08 (Vienna 2006)

References

External links
 

1978 births
Living people
Italian male middle-distance runners
Athletes (track and field) at the 2005 Mediterranean Games
Athletics competitors of Gruppo Sportivo Forestale
Mediterranean Games competitors for Italy
Sportspeople from Bruneck
Germanophone Italian people